The 28th edition of the Vuelta Ciclista de Chile was held from March 27 to April 3, 2005.

Stages

2005-03-27: Talca—Talca (4 km)

2005-03-28: Talca—Curicó (169 km)

2005-03-28: Curicó—Curicó (20 km)

2005-03-29: Curicó—Rancagua (165 km)

2005-03-30: Ascenso—Farellones (51 km)

2005-03-31: Santiago—Algarrobo (160 km)

2005-04-01: Algarrobo—Villa Alemana (150 km)

2005-04-02: Villa Alemana—Los Andes (150 km)

2005-04-02: Santiago ("Circuita") (60 km)

Final classification

Teams 

Líder

L.A.Aluminios – Liberty Seguros

Glassex-Bryc-Ace-Curico

Venezuela National Team

Publiguías Sport Club Trentin

Argentina National Team

Multihogar-M.A.G.-Curico

Kazakhstan National Team

Asociacion Ciclismo Talca

Extra Suzano Brasil

O.G.M

Amaru Argentina

Club Ciclista Ñielol-Municipal

Quinta Normal Keller-Dimar

Lascar Peñaflor

Cannondale

References 
 cyclingnews

Vuelta Ciclista de Chile
Chile
Vuelta Ciclista
March 2005 sports events in South America
April 2005 sports events in South America